Moritzburg may refer to:

 Moritzburg, Saxony, German municipality
 Moritzburg (Halle), fortified castle in Halle, Germany
 Moritzburg Castle, Baroque palace in Moritzburg, Saxony